72 Feronia (minor planet designation: 72 Feronia) is a quite large and dark main belt asteroid. It was the first asteroid discovery by C. H. F. Peters, on May 29, 1861, from Hamilton College, New York State. It was initially thought that Peters had merely seen the already known asteroid 66 Maja, but T.H. Safford showed that it was a new body. Safford named it after Feronia, a Roman fertility goddess.

The orbital plane is inclined by an angle of 5.4° to the plane of the ecliptic. This is a spectral type TDG asteroid with a cross-section size of 84 km. The asteroid has an estimated rotation period of 8.09 h. Hanuš et al. (2013) gives two possible solutions for the pole in ecliptic coordinates: (λ1, β1) = (287°, −39°) or (λ1, β1) = (102°, −55°). The estimated mass of 72 Feronia, and hence the density, has a large margin of error.

References

External links 
 
 

Background asteroids
Feronia
Feronia
TDG-type asteroids (Tholen)
18610529